Dhahar is a town in the eastern Sanaag region, and the capital of the Dhahar District. Puntland is in effective control, but Somaliland also claims this region based on pre colonial borders.

Overview
The town is disputed between Somaliland and Puntland, who has significant influence in the town. In November 2009, Puntland and Somaliland forces clashed near Dhahar. 

In 2016 an incident occurred between the two entities in Boodda-Cad, a remote settlement 30km west of Dhahar. According to Somaliland MP, Baar Said, the skirmishes took place away from Dhahar. A Somaliland Armed Forces base is present in the town where the 93rd division is positioned.

In January 2018, Gamal Mohamed Hassan, the Minister of Planning and International Cooperation visited Dhahar, as well as the city of Badhan in the Sanaag region along with Puntland officials.

In March 2021 police fired into the air to disperse pro-Farmaajo/anti Deni demonstrators in Dhahar district.

In August 2022, Puntland President Said Abdullahi Dani visited Dhahar and laid the foundation for a road connecting Dhahar and Hingalol. The 45 km road between Dhahar and Sheerbi is almost complete, but the road between Dhahar and Hingalol is only 20 km out of 70 km.

See also
Administrative divisions of Somaliland
Regions of Somaliland
Districts of Somaliland
Somalia–Somaliland border

References

External sites
Dhahar: Somalia, geographic.org

Populated places in Sanaag